Markel Olano Arrese (Beasain, June 2, 1965) is a Spanish politician, member of the Basque Nationalist Party and President of the Provincial Council of Gipuzkoa since June 6, 2007.

Beginnings in politics 
Olano began in politics at the age of fifteen in 1980 when he became a member of the youth organization, Euzko Gaztedi of the PNV (Basque Nationalist Party). His first years were spent in the internal structures of the EGI of Beasain and Goierri. While an active member in the EGI, he studied at the University of the Basque Country, graduating in Philosophy. He completed his higher education in doctorate studies in the same subject. Currently, he is writing his doctorate thesis.

Political work in the PNV 
During his militancy in the PNV, he held posts of varying responsibility. From 1996 to 2000, he was a member of the Gipuzko Buru Batzar (PNV provincial party executive for Gipuzkoa), with responsibility for the area of Euskara, Education and Culture. During this time he was also the representative of the PNV on the Standing Committee on the Declaration of Lizarra-Garazi.

In 2000 he was appointed member of the Euzkadi Buru Batzar of the PNV which was at that time chaired by Xabier Arzalluz. He was entrusted with the area of Youth, Euskara, Culture and Sport. He was also given the added responsibility of the newly formed area of Information and Communication Technology.

Provincial President

18th Legislature (2007-) 

Following the local elections of 2007, on June 6, 2007, his candidature received the greatest number of votes in the Juntas Generales (General Assembly) of Gipuzkoa and, as a result, on 12 of July the Provincial Council of Gipuzkoa was completed with the appointment of Markel Olano as its President.

The Provincial Council of Gipuzkoa Management Plan 2007-2011 sets out the general guidelines of the actions to be taken by Markel Olano for the 2007-2011 legislature.

References

External links 

 Página oficial de la oficina del Diputado General
 Blog de Markel Olano

Basque Nationalist Party politicians
1965 births
Living people
University of the Basque Country alumni